Francisco "Chaleco" López Contardo (born 15 September 1975 in Curicó, Maule Region, Chile) is a rally raid, motocross and enduro motorcycle rider and Off-road racing driver.  He's a veteran of the Dakar Rally, having made his first start on a bike in 2007, and has since then won the rally the UTV/SSV (T4) class in 2019 & 2021; and, in the Lightweight Prototypes (T3) class in 2022. 

He also took part in inaugral edition of the World Rally-Raid Championship in 2022, winning in the T3 category.

López began riding motorcycles at 4 years of age through the encouragement of his father Renato López, a  national motocross champion. His nickname Chaleco comes from the Spanish for vest, particularly the vest used for race protection.

Career
In 1989 López came first in the Latin American Motocross Championship in the 85cc class, which resulted in him becoming an official Honda rider. Between 1990 and 1994 he competed in the Chilean National Motocross Championship 125cc category, and was placed twice and won twice, and between 1995 and 2000 in the 250cc category of the same competition was placed once and won five times. He also won the Latin American Supercross Championship in 1998.

In 2001 López became the first Chilean rider to receive a gold medal in the Six Days of France competition at Brive-la-Gaillarde. The following year he rode in the 250cc four-stroke endurance world championship in Finland, gaining eighth place. He finished tenth overall in the 500cc four-stroke category in the same event in 2003. After a gold medal in the 2003 Six Days of Brazil competition at Fortaleza he was named as "best rider of year" by Chilean sports' journalists.

In 2004 he was national runner-up in super enduro, and participated again in the National Motocross Championship, and in Supermotard competitions. The following year he made his competitive debut in the Patagonia-Atacama Rally, withdrew through mechanical problems after winning the fourth stage, but finished in fourth position overall. He also debuted at the National Championship Motocross Entel, coming second in the 250cc category.

In 2006 López was placed first in the 450cc category of Patagonia-Atacama Rally, second in the d'Italia Sardegna Rally (Italy), and second in the 450cc category of the Morocco Rally.

He participated for the first time in the Dakar Rally in 2007 but had to withdraw during the race. The 2008 Dakar Rally was cancelled as a competition and replaced by an alternative, the 2008 Central Europe Rally, in which López finished second. He returned to Dakar in 2009, winning the first stage and  finishing seventh overall. The same year he was placed third in the Tunisia Rally. 
In the 2010 Dakar Rally he won the fifth, eighth and twelfth stage, was awarded first place in the 450cc category and third place overall. His Dakar third place, a position shared with his compatriot Carlo de Gavardo who competed in the 2001 Dakar Rally, is the highest placing of a Latin American at Dakar.

Honours

Racing Record

Dakar Rally

Complete World Rally-Raid Championship results
(key)

* Season still in progress

References

External links
 Official website (Spanish)

1975 births
Living people
Chilean motorcycle racers
Enduro riders
Off-road motorcycle racers
Dakar Rally motorcyclists
People from Curicó
Dakar Rally winning drivers